Gastromyzon venustus is a species of ray-finned fish in the genus Gastromyzon.

Footnotes 
 

Gastromyzon
Fish described in 2006
Endemic fauna of Brunei